was a Japanese designer of ukiyo-e style Japanese woodblock prints who was active in the 1790s. He is believed to have been a student of Chōbunsai Eishi, and was the teacher of Harukawa Goshichi.

This artist should not be confused with Kikukawa Eizan (1787–1867), a later designer of ukiyo-e woodblock prints.

References
Newland, Amy Reigle. (2005). Hotei Encyclopedia of Japanese Woodblock Prints.  Amsterdam: Hotei. ;  OCLC 61666175 

Ukiyo-e artists
Japanese printmakers
18th-century Japanese artists